Dashushen or Dashkand is a village de facto in the Askeran Province of the breakaway Republic of Artsakh, de jure in the Khojaly District of Azerbaijan, in the disputed region of Nagorno-Karabakh.

History 
During the Soviet period, the village was a part of the Askeran District of the Nagorno-Karabakh Autonomous Oblast.

Historical heritage sites 
Historical heritage sites in and around the village include the 17th/18th-century shrine of St. Saribek, the church of Surb Astvatsatsin built in 1843, a spring monument from 1898, as well as a 19th-century bridge and cemetery.

Economy and culture 
The population is mainly engaged in agriculture and animal husbandry. As of 2015, the village has a municipal building, a house of culture, a school, and a medical centre.

Demographics 
The village has an ethnic Armenian-majority population, had 120 inhabitants in 2005, and 133 inhabitants in 2015.

Gallery

References

External links 
 
 

Populated places in Askeran Province
Populated places in Khojaly District